Frederick of Lorraine may refer to:

 Frederick of Lorraine (cardinal), became the Pope as Stephen IX (1057-1058)
 Frederick I, Duke of Lorraine, (d. 1206)
 Frederick II, Duke of Lorraine, (d. 1213)
 Frederick III, Duke of Lorraine, (d. 1302)
 Frederick IV, Duke of Lorraine, (d. 1329)
 Frederick of Lorraine (Ferry de Lorraine), Bishop of Orléans (1297-1299)
 Frederick of Lorraine, Count of Vaudémont, French nobleman (b. 1371 - d. 1415)

See also
 Frederick (disambiguation)
 Frederick (given name)